Señor or Senor may refer to:

 Spanish-language honorific meaning Mr.
 Dan Senor

See also 
 Señorita (disambiguation)